Katherine "Katie" Wilkins (born May 10, 1982 in Lakeside, California) is an American former volleyball player. She was part of the USA women's national volleyball team at the 2006 FIVB Volleyball Women's World Championship in Japan.

Wilkins graduated from Valley Christian High in El Cajon, California in 2000. She attended Pepperdine University and was selected for the All-America first team by the American Volleyball Coaches Association in 2003 after 2 prior selections for the second team. During her time at Pepperdine, the team made four appearances in the NCAA Championships, reaching the "Elite 8" on two occasions, as well as being seeded first in 2003.

From 2006 to 2007, Wilkins played professionally for the Incheon Heungkuk Life Pink Spiders in South Korea's V-League, where she helped the Spiders to win the second consecutive championship.

Notes

External links 
 Hungkuk Pink Spiders player profiles (Korean)

Living people
1982 births
Pepperdine Waves women's volleyball players
American women's volleyball players
Sportspeople from El Cajon, California
People from Lakeside, California
Expatriate volleyball players in South Korea
American expatriate sportspeople in South Korea